Torishima, Tori-shima or Tori Shima, is a Japanese toponym or personal surname. Most versions of the name have the meaning Bird Island (鳥島 /とりしま), with some exceptions.

Places
Tori-shima (Izu Islands) or Izu Torishima, the island of the Izu Islands, Hachijō Subprefecture, Tokyo

Minami-Tori-shima (South Bird Island) or Marcus Island, Ogasawara, Tokyo, the easternmost point of Japan
Okinotorishima (Remote Bird Island), Ogasawara, Tokyo, the southernmost point of Japan

Kume Torishima or Okinawa Torishima, Kumejima, Okinawa
Iōtorishima (Sulfur Bird Island), Kumejima, Okinawa; major source of sulfur for the Ryukyu Kingdom
Nakanotorishima (Center Bird Island) or Ganges Island, the phantom island which was believed to exist in the early 20th century

People
 Kazuhiko Torishima, editor and producer, best known for Weekly Shōnen Jump magazine and various manga titles
 Dempow Torishima, science fiction author and illustrator, winner of the 2011 Sogen SF Short Story Prize for his story "Sisyphean (皆勤の徒 Kaikin no To)"